Arma Tactics (stylized as ARMA TACTICS) is a turn-based tactics video game for mobile devices that run iOS and Android, developed by Bohemia Interactive. The game was released in May 2013 for the Nvidia Shield. Unlike the previous Arma games, this is a turn-based tactical game where the player controls a squad of several so called "operatives".

Gameplay 
Arma Tactics is a turn-based strategy game. The player has control of 4 operators with different abilities. There are two game modes, one is the regular campaign and the other user created missions. Score up on experience points to gain operator superiority and add up credits to buy gadgets and upgrades.

Development 
As of July 26, 2013 this game will support only Tegra3 and Tegra4 devices a full list is available here. Although, there is a separate version for non-Tegra devices. Currently, the game is supported on Windows, Mac OS X, and Linux in addition to various mobile platforms.

Reception

Arma Tactics received mixed reviews for the iOS version, while the PC version received negative reviews. On Metacritic, the game holds score of 60/100 for the iOS version based on 5 reviews, and 47/100 based on 5 reviews.

References

External links 

2013 video games
Android (operating system) games
Bohemia Interactive games
IOS games
MacOS games
Simulation video games
Single-player video games
Windows games
Linux games
Turn-based tactics video games
Video games developed in the Czech Republic
Video games set in Africa
Arma (series)